John James Bodkin ( – January 1882) was an Irish Whig politician.

He lived at Kilclooney, County Galway, and was a justice of the peace and a deputy lieutenant.

His elder daughter Eliza Mary Bodkin (d.1902) was married to Lewis George Dive, of Milwich, Staffordshire.

References

External links
 
 

UK MPs 1831–1832
UK MPs 1835–1837
UK MPs 1837–1841
UK MPs 1841–1847
Whig (British political party) MPs for Irish constituencies
1801 births
1882 deaths